= Siege of Rustenburg =

- Part of First Boer War
Date	27 December 1880 – 30 March 1881
Location	Rustenburg, British-occupied Transvaal
Result	Boer victory

Belligerents
United Kingdom	South African Republic

Commanders and leaders
(United Kingdom) Cap. Auchinleck (United Kingdom) 2Lt. Despard	(South African Republic) Unknown

Units involved
(United Kingdom) 21st Royal Scots Fusiliers; Rustenburg Rifle Volunteers	Unknown

Strength
62–70+	600

The siege of Rustenburg was a siege that took place between 1880 and 1881 during the First Boer War. Boer forces of the South African Republic carried out the siege on Rustenburg, a British-controlled city inside of the Transvaal Colony, and captured it after three months.

== Preparations ==
In November 1880, several months before the opening of hostilities, much of the British garrison was withdrawn, leaving only a single battalion of 62 men of the 21st Regiment of Foot in Rustenburg. Following a rise in tension, and with conflict in South Africa imminent, British forces under Captain Auchinleck strengthened the defences of Fort Rustenburg, which included adding additional sandbags on top of existing Paraparats, laying small mines around the fort and the construction of additional military huts.

== Siege ==
On 24 December 1880, a Boer Commando of 600 men entered the town and on 27 December, demanded the surrender of the British garrison which was promptly refused by the Garrison Commander, Captain Auchinleck. The siege of Rustenburg commenced on 27 December 1880 and ended on 30 March 1881, lasting for 93 days. During the siege, the British garrison was subjected to privations and sickness and it also rained continuously for 45 days of the siege. The Boers had prepared a trench, close to the fort and on 4 February 1881, Captain Auchinleck and nine men, after dark, started their advance on the trench. Captain Auchinleck and his men had reached a point, 27 metres from the trench when they drew fire from the Boers in the trench. Captain Auchinleck and his men succeeded in driving the occupants from the trench, after which the Boer Commando fired on the fort from all directions. Captain Auchinleck was wounded in the elbow, his second bullet wound that day.

On 14 March 1881, the Boers notified the British garrison in the fort about the terms of the truce and on 30 March, Lieutenant Ryder, of the 60th Rifles, arrived from Sir Evelyn Wood's camp with a message that peace had been negotiated. The British garrison sustained few casualties during the siege; Captain Auchinleck was wounded four times while three other men sustained wounds, two of them serious.

Captain Auchinleck was killed in Burma in 1884 during an attack on the important town of Toungwingyu.
